Nereida Rodríguez (born 13 April 1950) is a Cuban fencer. She competed in the women's team foil event at the 1972 Summer Olympics.

References

1950 births
Living people
Cuban female foil fencers
Olympic fencers of Cuba
Fencers at the 1972 Summer Olympics